Paula Lewin (born 26 June 1971) is a Bermudian sailor. She competed at the 1992 Summer Olympics, 1996 Summer Olympics, and 2004 Summer Olympics.

References

1971 births
Living people
People from Hamilton, Bermuda
Bermudian female sailors (sport)
Olympic sailors of Bermuda
Sailors at the 1992 Summer Olympics – Europe
Sailors at the 1996 Summer Olympics – Europe
Sailors at the 2004 Summer Olympics – Yngling
Pan American Games bronze medalists for Bermuda
Sailors at the 1995 Pan American Games
MIT Engineers sailors
Pan American Games medalists in sailing
Medalists at the 1995 Pan American Games